Hřebejk is a Czech surname. Notable people with the surname include:

 Jan Hřebejk (born 1967), Czech film director and actor
 Štěpán Hřebejk (born 1982), Czech hockey player
 

Czech-language surnames